Asperdaphne perissa is a species of sea snail, a marine gastropod mollusk in the family Raphitomidae.

Description
The length of the shell attains 7.4 mm, its diameter 2.9 mm.

(Original description) The thin shell is ovate-fusiform and has an acuminate spire. it contains five whorls of which two in the protoconch, the latter subulate with spiral punctate grooves. The colour of the shell is dead white except a cinnamon protoconch. The sculpture shows spiral threads predominating, amounting on the body whorl to about thirty, not impinging on a broad anal fasciole, beneath this strong and widely spaced, becoming feebler and closer below the periphery, but waxing stronger on the back of the siphonal canal. The penultimate carries six such spirals, then three, then two on the earlier whorls. The radials are stronger on the younger whorls, but decrease on the older. In the body whorl they fade away about the periphery, and in the penultimate scarcely
reach across the whorl. In every case they are overridden by the spirals. The aperture is elliptical. The inner lip is overlaid by a substantial callus which, opposite the sulcus and at the base of the siphonal canal, is provided by a small but sharp tubercle. The outer lip is produced externally into a prominent varix, and beset within by a row of small tubercles. The siphonal canal is short and broad.

Distribution
This marine species is endemic to Australia and occurs off Queensland.

References

  Hedley, C. 1909. Mollusca from the Hope Islands, north Queensland. Proceedings of the Linnean Society of New South Wales 34(1): 420–466, pls 36–44 
 Li B.-Q. [Baoquan] & Li X.-Z. [Xinzheng] (2014) Report on the Raphitomidae Bellardi, 1875 (Mollusca: Gastropoda: Conoidea) from the China Seas. Journal of Natural History 48(17-18): 999-1025

External links
  Hedley, C. 1922. A revision of the Australian Turridae. Records of the Australian Museum 13(6): 213-359, pls 42-56 
 

perissa
Gastropods described in 1909
Gastropods of Australia